The Central Autónoma de Trabajadores (CAT) is a trade union centre in Chile.

The CAT is affiliated with the International Trade Union Confederation.

References

Trade unions in Chile
International Trade Union Confederation
Trade unions established in 1995